Paulina "Lina" Hedqvist (born 2 June 1995) is a Swedish football midfielder currently playing for Piteå IF in the Damallsvenskan.

References

External links
 Paulina Hedqvist at Piteå IF 

1995 births
Living people
Swedish women's footballers
Damallsvenskan players
Piteå IF (women) players
Women's association football midfielders